Quiet Storm is the twelfth studio album by American singer Peabo Bryson. It was released by Elektra Records in October 1986 in the United States. The album peaked at number 45 on the US Top R&B/Hip-Hop Albums.

Critical reception

Ron Wynn of AllMusic found that the results of "some over-produced, effectively sung ballads and a few decent up-tempo tracks [...] were disappointing but mildly successful."

Track listing
All tracks produced by Bryson and co-produced by Dwight Watkins.

Personnel 

Musicians

 Peabo Bryson – lead vocals, keyboards, percussion, arrangements 
 Myra Walker – keyboards, backing vocals 
 Oliver Wells – keyboards 
 George Martin – synthesizers 
 Dwight W. Watkins – synthesizers, bass, drum machine programming, backing vocals, arrangements (3)
 Pat Buchanan – guitars 
 Bill Mueller – guitars 
 Derek Scott – guitars 
 Yonrico Scott – drums 
 Charles Bryson – percussion 
 Jimmy "Lord" Brown – saxophones
 Valorie Jones – backing vocals 
 Sharon Scott – backing vocals 
 Jeanie Tracy – backing vocals 
 Brenda Williams – backing vocals 
 Cheryl Wilson – backing vocals 

Technical and Design

 Ron Christopher – engineer 
 Doug Johnson – engineer
 Brett Richardson – assistant engineer 
 Jeff Tomei – assistant engineer 
 Glenn Meadows – mastering at Georgetown Masters (Nashville, Tennessee).
 Bob Defrin – art direction, design 
 Carol Friedman – photography

Charts

References 

1986 albums
Peabo Bryson albums